Sir Robert Long, 6th Baronet (1705 – 10 February 1767) was an English politician.

The only surviving son of Sir James Long, 5th Baronet and his wife Henrietta Greville, Long was baptised on 8 November 1705 at St Martin in the Fields, Westminster, London. Educated at Balliol College, Oxford, he succeeded his father as 6th Baronet on 16 March 1729, and inherited the family estates, including the manors of Draycot and Athelhampton.

He was elected Member of Parliament for the rotten borough of Wootton Bassett in 1734, and for Wiltshire in 1741.

He married on 29 May 1735 at Woodford, Essex, Emma Child, the daughter of Richard Tylney, 1st Earl Tylney, of Wanstead (said to be possessed of 'almost revolting wealth'), and his wife Dorothy Glynn.

Sir Robert and Emma had two daughters and four sons including:
Sir James Tylney-Long, 7th Baronet, inherited Wanstead from his uncle, John Tylney, 2nd Earl Tylney
Charles Long, whose granddaughter Emma married George Julius Poulett Scrope

Many letters written by Sir Robert to his wife are held in the Wiltshire and Swindon Record Office, and furnish a picture of a happy marriage in the eighteenth century, illustrating a genuine affection for his wife, and fatherly love for his children, with nicknames such as 'Jemmy' and 'Dolly'. He had good-natured relationships with his dependants, even going so far as choosing material for a new dress for Lady Emma's companion.

Sir Robert Long died on 10 February 1767 and was buried at Draycot. His wife died on 8 March 1758.

Further reading 
Inheriting the Earth: The Long Family's 500 Year Reign in Wiltshire; Cheryl Nicol
Hand of Fate. The History of the Longs, Wellesleys and the Draycot Estate in Wiltshire. Tim Couzens 2001

Sources 
The Lion and the Rose - Ethel M. Richardson, 1922

1705 births
1767 deaths
Members of the Parliament of Great Britain for Wiltshire
Alumni of Balliol College, Oxford
Baronets in the Baronetage of England
Robert
Tory MPs (pre-1834)
British MPs 1734–1741
British MPs 1741–1747
British MPs 1747–1754
British MPs 1754–1761
British MPs 1761–1768